Shawn Michael Patterson (born September 14, 1965) is an American composer and songwriter. His most notable work to date is as the songwriter/composer for the song "Everything Is Awesome", written for the Warner Brothers feature film The Lego Movie (2014).

Early life
Shawn Patterson was born in the small rural town of Athol, Massachusetts, to blue collar working parents, Ronald and Joan Patterson. His father was a gifted musician playing several instruments including the saxophone, guitar, trumpet, and pedal steel. However, Patterson's very first draw to music came from watching comedian Steve Martin play the banjo on television during his Let's Get Small Tour.

Martin's banjo playing was so influential, Patterson begged his parents to purchase a 5-string banjo and began taking lessons studying Bluegrass and Dixieland styles of music. Although he was jamming along with his father, Patterson grew bored with the instrument after a year and began tampering with the banjo, attempting to attach a pickup to the head and run it through a guitar amplifier owned by a friend from school. Eventually, he switched to electric guitar.

In June 1977, Patterson and his father attended a screening of Star Wars and this was the first time film music caught his attention and a career was born. Patterson was also influenced by John Williams' 1978 Superman score, which he attended multiple times just to try and absorb the music.

On June 2, 1979, Patterson's father died after suffering a brain aneurysm leaving him, his two brothers and mother, Joan Patterson. Patterson devoted himself completely to music and his guitar playing. He was soon exposed to rock bands such as Van Halen, AC/DC, Queen and The Who.

With the release of the Blues Brothers film in 1980, Patterson was heavily drawn to the influences of the film's soundtrack and band: Elmore James, Sam and Dave, and Booker T and the MG's. For the next four years, he was consumed by practicing and began writing songs. He played in and out of local bands until he graduated from Athol High School in 1983 and attended Berklee College of Music on scholarship at age 17.

At Berklee, Patterson was exposed with great and talented musicians from around the world, often befriending and playing with the most talented musicians he found. However, he experienced tremendous discomfort in his left hand most likely due to a broken left collarbone as a child and began experimenting with composition while at Berklee.

Upon leaving Berklee at the end of summer 1983, Patterson resumed playing in and around Massachusetts, teaching guitar lessons in local music stores and privately. He began studying with local legend jazz educator and pianist Mark Marquis, who steered him to the Fitchburg Public Library with the instructions to start exploring their jazz record collection.

Patterson's musical voyage took a serious turn as he discovered a wide range of jazz styles that would forever alter his musical course: Charlie Parker, Dizzy Gillespie, Joe Pass, Miles Davis, Art Blakey, Charlie Christian, Jim Hall, and Wes Montgomery were beacons of inspiration which resulted in his dedication to studying with Marquis on guitar. Many times, he would study for periods of 12 hours a day.

At this time, Patterson began to experiment with writing a wider range of song writing material, having also been heavily influenced by Count Basie, Duke Ellington, and the Benny Goodman Sextet.

Career
In 1986, Patterson left for Los Angeles to attend the Grove School of Music. While there, Patterson worked full-time during the night shift as security guard on Sunset Boulevard and would attend college in the daytime. Upon completion at Grove, he returned to Massachusetts, continued his private studies with Marquis and began playing around the state in various jazz ensembles he led.

In 1988, Patterson accepted a scholarship to attend the prestigious Jazz in July program and University of Massachusetts, Amherst. Patterson was hand selected out of many students to study privately and perform with the featured legendary educators and musicians, Dr. Billy Taylor and Max Roach. However, he never lost sight of his dream to compose music to picture and he wrote music for a few independent documentaries.

With $400 in his pocket and a few guitars in his backseat, Patterson drove to Los Angeles in 1990 to relocate permanently. He played some live gigs on occasion with friends he had met through Grove, but his priority was to build a small studio and begin producing his own music to get composing work.

He landed a job as a production assistant at the animated television show, Alvin and the Chipmunks, where in 1991, he sold his very first song for one of the albums of the series. The song was a rap song, "Rock The House", of which he wrote the music and lyrics. At this time, Patterson was renting various people's small project studios to produce his own compositions and began writing for trailer houses writing the music for large international ad campaigns such as The Fisher King, My Girl, and several others.

Patterson moved on to The Ren & Stimpy Show as Operations Manager in search of better pay. Soon, however, he moved into the audio/post production department and began working as a music editor.  Here on the show, Patterson spent 8–10 hours a day cutting music to picture and experimenting with various classical styles to not only continue to the show's tradition of music but to push it into new territory stylistically.

Patterson continued selling his own music where he could and soon was being asked to write original songs and bits of score for the show. Among several things, Patterson wrote a series of featured big band songs in the style of Frank Sinatra for the episode, "Ol' Blue Nose" directed form the Steve Loter and sung by Billy West.

As The Ren & Stimpy Show came to an end, Patterson was already working as a freelance composer and songwriter.  Billy West handed Patterson's demo CD out around Los Angeles and it soon found its way into the hands of Doug Langdale and Audu Paden, who hired him as composer for the animated series, Project G.e.e.K.e.R. in 1995.

Patterson was the score composer and songwriter for three seasons on the Emmy Award-winning series Robot Chicken and series score composer for the award-winning TV series, El Tigre: The Adventures of Manny Rivera, created by The Book of Life's Jorge R. Gutierrez. He also scored the 1995 horror film The Demolitionist, and composed music for Disney Channel's Dave the Barbarian.

Patterson is also the score composer and songwriter on DreamWorks Animation's The Adventures of Puss in Boots, a Netflix original series about the character Puss from the Shrek franchise.

He has worked alongside a variety of directors in his career including Chris McKay, Henry Selick, Tom McGrath, Conrad Vernon, Phil Lord and Chris Miller.

Patterson has also written and produced a number of songs for artists including Seth MacFarlane, Zac Efron, 50 Cent, Matthew Morrison, RZA, Ke$ha, Patrick Stump, Steven Tyler of Aerosmith and many more.

Patterson himself guest starred as a pubescent Theodore in the Robot Chicken episode "Crushed by a Steamroller on My 53rd Birthday" on Adult Swim and as Sid in a 1995 episode of Ren & Stimpy on Nickelodeon.

Patterson's most notable contribution was his song "Everything is Awesome" for The Lego Movie (2014), which spent six consecutive weeks on the UK Singles and thirty-one on the UK Indie, peaking on both charts in early March 2014 at No. 17 and No. 2, respectively. In the US Billboard Hot 100, the song charted No. 57. The single had sold 418,000 copies in the United States by the end of June 2014, and became Gold certified at the end of that year. On July 14, 2017, it was certified Platinum, having sold more than 1,000,000 units since its release. It was nominated for Best Original Song by a number of organizations including the Motion Picture Academy and was performed live on-stage at the 2015 Academy Awards. The song was also remixed for the sequel, The Lego Movie 2: The Second Part (2019).

Awards and nominations
Academy Award-nominated for Best Original Song.

Grammy nominated for Best Song Written for Visual Media.

Satellite Award nominated for Best Original Song.

Critics' Choice Movie Award nominated for Best Song.

Denver Film Critics Society Award winner for Best Original Song.

Georgia Film Critics Association nominated for Best Original Song.

Hollywood Music in Media Award winner for Song - Animated Film.

Houston Film Critics Society Award winner for Best Original Song.

Talk Film Society Award winner for Best Original Song.

Iowa Film Critics Award winner for Best Original Song.

Phoenix Film Critics Society Award winner for Best Original Song.

Variety Artisans Award winner.

Personal life
He is trained in martial arts under the instruction of Sifu Ed Monghan and Sifu JoAnn Wabisca at Ekata Training Center in Valencia, California.

Filmography

Television

References

External links
  of Shawn Patterson. Includes biography, filmography, photos, video and current projects
 

Living people
1965 births
People from Athol, Massachusetts
American male composers
21st-century American composers
21st-century American male musicians